The Cost of Beauty is a 1924 British silent romance film directed by Walter Summers and starring Betty Ross Clarke, Lewis Dayton and James Lindsay. It was made at Isleworth Studios.

Cast
 Betty Ross Clarke as Diana Faire  
 Lewis Dayton as Garth Walters 
 James Lindsay as Henri Delatour  
 Tom Reynolds 
 Patrick Aherne
 Nina Vanna

References

Bibliography
 Harris, Ed. Britain's Forgotten Film Factory: The Story of Isleworth Studios. Amberley Publishing, 2013.

External links

1924 films
British romance films
British silent feature films
1920s romance films
1920s English-language films
Films directed by Walter Summers
Films shot at Isleworth Studios
British black-and-white films
Silent romance films
1920s British films